The men's 5000 metres T54 event at the 2020 Summer Paralympics in Tokyo took place between 27 and 28 August 2021.

Records
Prior to the competition, the existing records were as follows:

Results

Heats
First 3 in each heat (Q) and the next 4 fastest (q) advance to the Final round.

Heat 1 took place on 27 August 2021, at 20:35:

Heat 2 took place on 27 August 2021, at 20:54:

Final
The final took place on 28 August 2021, at 20:24:

References

Men's 5000 metres T54
2021 in men's athletics